The Armenian Catholic Eparchy of Isfahan (or Ispahan or Esfahan) is a suffragan eparchy (Eastern Catholic diocese), covering all of Iran, in the ecclesiastical province 'of Cilicia' of the Armenian Catholic Patriarch, the head of the Armenian Catholic Church (Armenian Rite in the Armenian language).

Its cathedral episcopal see is in Isfahan, Iran.

History 
Established on 30 April 1850 as Eparchy (Diocese) of Ispahan (Esfáan), on territory previously without Ordinary for the particular church sui iurus.

Episcopal ordinaries
(all Armenian Rite)

''Eparchs (Bishops) of Ispahan
 John Baptist Apcar (1954.09.24 – death 1967.07.09)
 Léonce Tchantayan (1967.08.05 – 1972.01.16); later Titular Bishop of Sebastopolis in Armenia (1972.01.16 – death 1990.11.13) & Auxiliary Eparch of Cilicia of the Armenians (Lebanon) (1977 – 1990.11.13)
 Vartan Tékéyan, Patriarchal Clergy Institute of Bzommar (I.C.P.B.) (1972.12.06 – death 1999.04.12), also President of Iranian Episcopal Conference (1995 – 1999)
 Neshan Karakéhéyan, I.C.P.B. (2000.09.27 – 2005.04.02), also Apostolic Administrator of Greece of the Armenians (Greece) (2000.09.27 – 2015.03.21); previously Ordinary of Greece of the Armenians (1991 – 2000.09.27); later Ordinary of East Europe of the Armenians (Armenia) (2005.04.02 – retired 2010.01.06), Patriarchal Administrator of Ispahan of the Armenians (2005.04.02 – retired 2015.10.01), Titular Archbishop of Adana of the Armenians (2005.04.02 – ...)
 Sarkis Davidian, I.C.P.B. (2015.10.01 – ...)

See also 
 Catholic Church in Iran

References

External links 
 GCatholic with incumbent biography links
 GCatholic Armenian Catholic Isfahan cathedral

Armenian Catholic eparchies
Armenia